Mynampally Hanumanth Rao is an Indian politician. He is an MLA representing the Malkajgiri constituency in the Telangana Legislative Assembly. He is also a general secretary and the district president for Greater Hyderabad in his party Telangana Rashtra Samithi.

Political career
Hanumanth Rao was twice elected as a Member of the Legislative Assembly. First from Ramayampet (constituency abolished in 2009) in 2008 and then from Medak in 2009. In 2014, he contested the Malkajgiri Lok Sabha seat as a Telangana Rashtra Samithi candidate and finished in second place.

He was unanimously elected as an MLC from MLAs Quota on 5 March 2017.

On 12 December 2018, he resigned from his Member of Legislative Council position after he won the Malkajgiri Assembly Constituency as a Member of Legislative Assembly third time with a majority of 74,000 votes.

References

 .

 

Telangana politicians
Telangana Rashtra Samithi politicians
People from Telangana
Living people
1966 births
Telangana MLAs 2018–2023